Subversives For Lucifer is the second full length studio album by the blackened death metal band Abominator. It was released in 2001 on Osmose Productions.

Track listing
Intro / Renegades at Hell's Command - 6:44
Desolate Feast - 5:20
Carnivorous Strike of the Knife - 6:27
As God of a Heretic Tribe - 5:35
Ignite the Ceremonial Burning - 5:29
From Flesh to Fire - 6:06
Domain of Iblis - 4:50
Subversives for Lucifer / Outro - 8:10

External links
Homepage

[ Release] at Allmusic

2001 albums
Abominator albums